Metsadzor is a village in the Metsadzor Municipality of the Aragatsotn Province of Armenia. Most inhabitants are Yezidis – the town's name means "waterless" in Kurdish.

References 

Report of the results of the 2001 Armenian Census
Kiesling, Rediscovering Armenia, p. 18, available online at the US embassy to Armenia's website

Populated places in Aragatsotn Province
Yazidi populated places in Armenia